Waduwadeniya is a Grama Niladhari District in Sri Lanka, census code 11G. It is located within Sabaragamuva Province.

See also
List of towns in Sabaragamuwa

References
Census Codes of Administrative Units, Sabaragamuva Province, Sri Lanka

Populated places in Sabaragamuwa Province